Darkness Dynamite is a French metalcore band from Paris, founded in 2006.

Biography 
With the success of their debut EP Through the Ashes of the Wolves Darkness Dynamite toured extensively with many internationally well-known band such as Korn, Sevendust, The Chariot, Becoming the Archetype, Bring Me the Horizon, Architects, Blessed by a Broken Heart, Inhatred, Maroon and Job for a Cowboy. After that, Darkness Dynamite began composing their first album. Stéphane Buriez, former singer of Loudblast and producer of bands like The Spirit of the Clan, Loudblast and Behemoth, contacted them and decided to produce their upcoming album. They were joined by a new vocalist, Junior Rodriguez and a new drummer, Julien Granger, shortly after. The Astonishing Fury of Mankind was released 6 June 2009.

Band members

Current members 
Chris de Oliveira – bass (2007–present)
Zack Larbi – guitar, vocals (2007–present)
Nelson Martins – guitar, vocals (2007–present)
Junior Rodriguez – vocals (2008–present)
Vincent Wallois – drums (2009–present)

Former members 
Eddie Czaicki - vocals (2007-2008)
Alexandre Desmonts – drums (2007–2009)

Timeline

Discography 
 Darkness Dynamite – 2006
 Through the Ashes of the Wolves – 2007
 The Astonishing Fury of Mankind – 2009
 Under the Painted Sky – 2013

French metalcore musical groups
Musical groups established in 2006
Musical groups from Paris
Musical quintets
Post-hardcore groups
2006 establishments in France